Take Control is the second studio album by British punk rock band Slaves, released on 30 September 2016. The album was produced by former Beastie Boys member Mike D, who also makes a guest appearance on the song "Consume or Be Consumed". Lead single "Spit It Out" debuted at number 37 on the UK Rock & Metal Singles Chart upon its initial release, later re-entering at number 28.

Background
Producer Mike D said of the album and the band:

Vincent said that the album is "more well-rounded" than their debut album, and that it "dips a bit further in to politics" with their aim being to "inspire people to have an opinion". There will also be "a few songs where [they] play [their] instruments differently and Isaac might be on bass while Vincent plays guitar, and Isaac raps a bit". The duo wanted to "write some heavier music" that was "very guitar-based and thrashy" but had to slow the songs down due to "various injuries".

Promotion
In order to promote Take Control, Slaves initially announced a 15-date UK tour in November 2016, although later announced a smaller-scale "Back in the Van" UK tour for September 2016 to precede the release of the album, in which the band are set to play much smaller venues across the UK, which normally "never get bands coming back to them" when they become more widely known. In order to acquire tickets, buyers had to pre-order the album from the band's website before tickets went on sale. Tickets for all venues had fully sold out within an hour.

Accolades

Track listing

Charts

References

External links

2016 albums
Soft Play albums
Albums produced by Mike D
Virgin EMI Records albums